The Peach Springs Trading Post, at 863 W AZ 66 in Peach Springs, Arizona, is a historic building built in 1928.  It was built by Cecil Davis and includes Pueblo Revival architecture.  It has served as a post office and a general store and also as a dwelling.  It was listed on the National Register of Historic Places in 2003.

In 2003, it was owned by the Hualapai Indian Nation.

A 1936 postcard image depicts young men on horseback in front of the post, with a swastika in the signage of the post in the background.

References 

Commercial buildings on the National Register of Historic Places in Arizona
Traditional Native American dwellings
Buildings and structures completed in 1928
Buildings and structures in Mohave County, Arizona
Pueblo Revival architecture in Arizona
National Register of Historic Places in Mohave County, Arizona